Buddenbrooks, released also as Buddenbrooks: The Decline of a Family, is a 2008 German drama film directed by Heinrich Breloer, adapted from the 1901 novel of the same name by Thomas Mann. Set in the 19th century, the film portrays the decline of a wealthy family of grain merchants in Lübeck, the Buddenbrooks, and with them a whole way of life as Germany changed radically. It stars Armin Mueller-Stahl as the family's patriarch Consul Jean Buddenbrook, Iris Berben as his wife Bethsy Buddenbrook, and Jessica Schwarz, Mark Waschke and August Diehl as their children Tony, Thomas, and Christian Buddenbrook, respectively.

Buddenbrooks was released in Germany on 25 December 2008, and by July 2009 it was seen by more than 1.2million viewers. The film had its American premiere at the Seattle International Film Festival in June 2009. In 2010, it was released as a two–episode television miniseries, which was shown on the Arte on 23 and 24 December, and on the Das Erste on 27 and 28 December.

Plot 
The film tells the story of the Buddenbrook family over three generations —  Jean Buddenbrook and his wife Bethsy; their sons Thomas and Christian; their daughter Tony; and Thomas' son Hanno. Even though he dearly loves them, Jean Buddenbrook expects his children to subordinate their personal happiness to the welfare of the family firm. The first to learn this is Tony who, after a holiday romance with a medical student from a modest family, is married off to Bendix Grünlich, a prominent businessman in Hamburg who shortly after goes bankrupt: Jean brings her home.

Her brothers have meanwhile been learning their trade in Amsterdam and London. Crushed by Tony's marital disaster and several unlucky transactions, Jean Buddenbrook makes over the business to Thomas, the elder son. Thomas leaves his secret mistress, a florist's assistant, and although he does not love her marries Gerda, a Dutch heiress who is more interested in playing the violin and in consorting with aristocrats. After having spent time in Valparaiso, Christian returns to Lübeck but shows no interest in the firm, preferring to drink and haunt the theatre, especially the actress Aline. The patriarch Jean dies, and his widow Bethsy holds the family together.

The divorced Tony catches the eye of Alois Permaneder, a cheerful Bavarian hop merchant who marries her and takes her off to his home in Munich. His fondness for drink and for the maid leads her to return shortly to Lübeck. She suggests to Thomas that he could expand the business by buying grain before harvest from the estates of Prussian aristocrats. He buys a whole crop that is than destroyed by hail, losing all his outlay and denting his reputation.

Gerda at length gives birth to a son Hanno, who proves to be a gifted musician but has no interest in the family or the business. Thomas is elected a senator, like his father but, after the extraction of a troublesome tooth, collapses and dies. His will requires that the near-moribund firm be liquidated. Hanno dies in his teens and Gerda returns to the Netherlands. Tony and Christian, after selling the family home and contents, go their separate ways.

Cast 

 Jessica Schwarz as Antonie "Tony" Buddenbrook
 Mark Waschke as Thomas Buddenbrook
 August Diehl as Christian Buddenbrook
 Armin Mueller-Stahl as Consul Johann "Jean" Buddenbrook
 Iris Berben as Elisabeth "Bethsy" Buddenbrook
  as Gerda Buddenbrook
 Alexander Fehling as Morten Schwarzkopf
 Justus von Dohnányi as Bendix Grünlich
  as Alois Permaneder
 Nina Proll as Aline Puvogel
  as Hanno Buddenbrook
 Sylvester Groth as Kesselmeyer
 Fedja van Huêt as Hermann Hagenström
  as Julchen Möllendorpf
 Sunnyi Melles as Mrs. Möllendorpf
  as Senator Möllendorpf
  as René Maria von Trotha
 Maja Schöne as Anna Iwersen
 Tonio Arango as Stefan Kistenmaker
  as Doctor Giesecke
 André Hennicke as Gosch
  as Ida Jungmann
  as Consul Lebrecht Kröger
 Michael Abendroth as Doctor Grabow
  as Kai von Mölln
  as Diener Anton

Awards and nominations

Home media 
Buddenbrooks was released on DVD and Blu-ray on 11 September 2009.

References

External links 
 
 

2008 films
German drama films
2000s German-language films
2000s German television miniseries
German epic films
Films based on German novels
Films based on works by Thomas Mann
Films set in Germany
Films set in the 1840s
Films set in the 1850s
Films set in the 1860s
Films set in the 1870s
Films shot in Germany
Television shows based on German novels
Warner Bros. films
Films shot in Bruges
Films shot in Cologne
Films about businesspeople
Films about families
Remakes of German films
German-language television shows
2000s German films